Fernando Álvaro Picún de León (born 14 February 1972) is a retired Uruguayan football player. He was a defender. He played for the Uruguay national team at 1999 Copa América in Paraguay.

Club statistics

National team statistics

Honours

National team
 
 1999 Copa América: 2nd place

References

External links
 

1972 births
Living people
Uruguayan footballers
Uruguay international footballers
1999 Copa América players
Association football defenders
Club Atlético River Plate (Montevideo) players
Feyenoord players
Defensor Sporting players
Urawa Red Diamonds players
Danubio F.C. players
Uruguayan Primera División players
Eredivisie players
J1 League players
J2 League players
Uruguayan expatriate footballers
Uruguayan expatriate sportspeople in Japan
Expatriate footballers in Japan
Uruguayan expatriate sportspeople in the Netherlands
Expatriate footballers in the Netherlands
Footballers from Montevideo